Suzanne Lenglen and Elizabeth Ryan were the defending champions, but decided not to play together. Lenglen partnered with Julie Vlasto, but lost in the second round to Ryan and her partner Mary Browne.

Browne and Ryan defeated Evelyn Colyer and Kitty Godfree in the final, 6–1, 6–1 to win the ladies' doubles tennis title at the 1926 Wimbledon Championships.

Draw

Finals

Top half

Section 1

The nationality of EC Mogg is unknown.

Section 2

Bottom half

Section 3

The nationalities of Mrs Herriot and Mrs van Praagh are unknown.

Section 4

References

External links

Women's Doubles
Wimbledon Championship by year – Women's doubles
Wimbledon Championships - Doubles
Wimbledon Championships - Doubles